Manzonia darwini is a species of minute sea snail, a marine gastropod mollusk or micromollusk in the family Rissoidae.

The species is named after the 19th century naturalist Charles Darwin.

Description

Distribution

References

darwini
Molluscs of the Atlantic Ocean
Molluscs of the Canary Islands
Gastropods described in 1987